Ryan Perry Rolison (born July 11, 1997) is an American professional baseball pitcher in the Colorado Rockies organization. He played college baseball at the University of Mississippi.

Amateur career
Rolison attended and graduated from the University School of Jackson in Jackson, Tennessee. As a junior, he compiled a 0.74 ERA with 104 strikeouts. As a senior, he was 9-0 in nine starts, striking out 108 in 58 innings while allowing only three runs and ten hits, earning him the title of Tennessee's DII-A Mr. Baseball. He was selected by the San Diego Padres in the 37th round of the 2016 Major League Baseball draft, but did not sign and instead enrolled at the University of Mississippi where he played college baseball.

As a freshman in 2017, Rolison began the season in the bullpen before moving into the starting rotation. In 19 games (ten starts), he compiled a 6-3 record and a 3.06 ERA, holding opposing batters to a .242 average, earning him a spot on the SEC All-Freshman team along with freshman All-American honors. After his freshman season, he played for the Orleans Firebirds of the Cape Cod Baseball League where he went 4-0 with a 1.92 ERA and was named a league all-star. Rolison was named a First Team Preseason All-American prior to his sophomore season. As a sophomore in 2018, Rolison posted a 10-4 record over 17 appearances (16 starts) with a 3.70 ERA and 120 strikeouts.

Professional career
Rolison was selected by the he Colorado Rockies in the first round, with the 22nd overall selection, in the 2018 Major League Baseball draft, and he signed with the Rockies for a $2.9 million signing bonus. He made his professional debut with the Grand Junction Rockies of the Rookie-level Pioneer League and spent the whole season there. In nine starts, he compiled a 0-1 record with a 1.86 ERA and a 0.79 WHIP.

Rolison began 2019 with the Asheville Tourists of the Class A South Atlantic League. Rolison was promoted to the Lancaster JetHawks of the Class A-Advanced California League after going 2-1 with a 0.69 ERA and 14 strikeouts in 14 innings with the Tourists. With Lancaster, he was selected to participate in the All-Star Game as a member of the South Division team. Over 22 starts with the JetHawks, Rolison went 6-7 with a 4.87 ERA, striking out 118 over  innings. He did not play a minor league game in 2020 due to the cancellation of the minor league season caused by the COVID-19 pandemic. To begin the 2021 season, Rolison was assigned to the Hartford Yard Goats of the Double-A Northeast. After going 2-1 with a 3.07 ERA over three starts, he was promoted to the Albuquerque Isotopes of the Triple-A West. On June 14, he was placed on the injured list after having his appendix removed. He was expected to return in early August, but broke a bone in his left hand while fielding balls, delaying his return. He was activated later that same month. Over ten starts with the Isotopes, Rolison went 2-2 with a 5.91 ERA and 45 strikeouts over 45 innings. Following the end of the season, Rolison began playing in the Dominican Professional Baseball League for the Tigres del Licey.

On November 19, 2021, the Rockies selected Rolison's contract and added him to their 40-man roster. He opened the 2022 season on the injured list with a shoulder injury. In June, it was announced that Rolison was scheduled for surgery and would miss the entire season.

Personal life
The same night that Rolison was selected by the Rockies in the draft, controversy emerged after a tweet by him from 2012 resurfaced in which he wrote “Well we have one hope left … if someone shoots him during his speech,” regarding the 2012 United States presidential election. He later apologized, saying “I had no idea what I was talking about, and it was immature of me to post something like that.”

References

External links

Ole Miss Rebels bio

 

1997 births
Living people
People from Jackson, Tennessee
Baseball players from Tennessee
Baseball pitchers
Ole Miss Rebels baseball players
Orleans Firebirds players
Grand Junction Rockies players
Asheville Tourists players
Lancaster JetHawks players
Hartford Yard Goats players
Albuquerque Isotopes players